Barbeque Integrated Inc. (or simply Smokey Bones and doing business as Smokey Bones Bar and Fire Grill) is an American casual dining restaurant chain. Owned by Barbeque Integrated Inc. and under the umbrella of Sun Capital Partners, Smokey Bones is headquartered in Aventura, Florida. As of August 2015, Smokey Bones has 66 restaurants in 16 Eastern states. Under its previous owner, Smokey Bones had as many as 128 restaurants across most of the United States before it shrank to its current core area.

History
In August 1999, Darden Restaurants, Inc. opened the first Smokey Bones restaurant in Orlando, Florida, at the site previously occupied by Red Lobster and close to Darden's headquarters. By June 2001, Darden had opened 8 additional Smokey Bones BBQ Sports Bar restaurants in Florida, the Midwest and Northeast.

On May 5, 2007, it was announced that Darden Restaurants was closing 56 Smokey Bones restaurants and planning to sell the remaining 73 in its struggling chain. The closings occurred in 22 states, primarily across the southwest and north-central United States.

The chain was sold to Barbeque Integrated Inc. in December 2007 for approximately $80 million.

On August 4, 2015, Ryan Esko was named CEO of Smokey Bones. Esko was replaced by James O’Reilly in 2019.

See also
 List of barbecue restaurants

References

External links
 Official website

Companies based in Orlando, Florida
Restaurants established in 1999
1999 establishments in Florida
Restaurants in Orlando, Florida
Restaurant chains in the United States
Barbecue restaurants in the United States
2007 mergers and acquisitions